Yazoo may refer to:

Businesses and organizations
Yazoo Brewing Company, a brewery in Nashville, Tennessee, United States
Yazoo/Kees (originally Yazoo Manufacturing Company), a maker of lawn mowers owned by Husqvarna
Yazoo Records, an American record label

Culture
Yazoo (band), a 1980s English pop band, known as Yaz in Canada and the United States
Yazoo (language)
Yazoo (drink), a flavoured milk drink made by Campina
Yazoo, a character from Final Fantasy VII: Advent Children

Geography
Yazoo Clay, a geologic formation in Alabama, Louisiana, and Mississippi
Yazoo County, Mississippi
Little Yazoo, Mississippi
Yazoo City, Mississippi
Yazoo Delta Railroad
Yazoo lands, historic area in Mississippi and Alabama, formerly occupied by Yazoo tribe
Yazoo River, in the state of Mississippi, United States
Yazoo stream, a type of floodplain tributary

Other uses
Yazoo people, a Native American people who lived in Mississippi, United States
USS Yazoo, several United States Navy ships
Yazoo darter (Etheostoma raneyi) a species of fish endemic to Mississippi, United States
Yazoo shiner (Notropis rafinesquei), a species of fish endemic to Mississippi, United States